Events in the year 1846 in Belgium.

Incumbents

Monarch: Leopold I
Prime Minister: Sylvain Van de Weyer (to 31 March); Barthélémy de Theux de Meylandt (from 31 March)

Events

 21 March – Achel Priory founded as a filiation from Westmalle Abbey.
 25 May – Provincial elections
 14 June – Founding congress of the Liberal Party.
 29 July – Commercial treaty with the Netherlands.

Art and architecture
Buildings
 6 May — Work begins on Galeries Royales Saint-Hubert, designed by Jean-Pierre Cluysenaar

Publications
Periodicals
 Annales parlementaires de Belgique.
 Messager des sciences historiques (Ghent, Léonard Hebbelynck). 
La renaissance: Chronique des arts et de la littérature, 7.
 Revue de Belgique begins publication
 Revue de Bruxelles reverts to its original title.

Monographs and reports
 Rapport triennial sur la situation de l'instruction primaire en Belgique (Brussels, 1846)

Guidebooks and directories
 A. Hochsteyn, Dictionnaire-postal de la Belgique, 2 vols.
 A Week in Brussels: The Stranger's Guide to the Capital of Belgium, 3rd edition (London, Edwards and Hughes; Brussels, Edward Browne)

Literature
 Karel Lodewijk Ledeganck, Drie Zustersteden.
 Jules de Saint-Genois, Le château de Wildenborg, ou les mutinés du siége d'Ostende (1604) (2 vols., Brussels, A. van Dale).

Births
 24 January – Isidore Verheyden, painter (died 1905)
 28 February – Jean de la Hoese, painter (died 1917)
 5 March – Edouard Van Beneden, biologist (died 1910)
 27 April – Charles Joseph Van Depoele, electrical engineer (died 1892)
 2 June – Émile Storms, soldier (died 1918)
 9 August – François J. Terby, astronomer (died 1911)
 10 August
Eugène Goblet d'Alviella, politician (died 1925)
Leon Van der Rest, banker (died 1932)
 16 September – Marie Popelin, feminist (died 1913)
 19 November – Emile Wauters, painter (died 1933)

Deaths
 24 June – Jan Frans Willems (born 1793), writer
 1 July – Auguste Duvivier (born 1772), politician
 8 October – Henri van der Haert (born 1790), painter
 29 October – Jean-Louis van Aelbroeck (born 1755), agronomist

References

 
1840s in Belgium
Belgium